China White (Chien Na Wei) is a supervillain that appears in American comic books published by DC Comics. She first appeared in Green Arrow: Year One (Oct. 2007), and was created by Andy Diggle and Jock. White was primarily an adversary of Green Arrow in his early years.

China White appeared as a recurring character on The CW Arrowverse show Arrow, played by actress Kelly Hu.

Fictional character biography
China White was the leader of a drug crime group that dominated the South Pacific. She supplied heroin imports for the West Coast United States, Australia, Japan, and the entire Pacific Rim from her base of operations on a volcanic island in Fiji. Many years ago, millionaire playboy Oliver Queen found himself manipulated into financing several of China White's operations, though he was unaware that he was secretly investing in a crime group. When Ollie's presence threatened to expose China White, she ordered the mercenary henchman Hackett to kill him. Hackett beat up Oliver and tossed him over the side of his boat, the Pacific Queen. Ollie survived and managed to make his way to the island. He discovered China White's poppy fields and learned that she had been using local villagers as slave labor to sow the fields. When she discovered that Hackett had failed to kill Oliver Queen, she ordered him to finish the job or else he would spend his last days being slowly eaten away in a rat-infested cage.

DC Rebirth
During DC Rebirth, China White appears in the ninth issue of New Super-Man and leader of her own Triad which includes now-speedster Avery Ho. She sends members Strato the Cloud Man and Snakepit to attack LexCorp's Research and Development Facility in order to claim artifacts which she believes were stolen from the East by Lex Luthor. She and her allies battle Lex and Kong Kenan, the Super-Man of China, until they are interrupted by the arrival of Superman.

Powers and abilities
White was a formidable martial artist, and was rumored to be a great assassin.

In other media

 Chien Na Wei / China White appears in Arrow, portrayed by Kelly Hu. This version is an assassin-for-hire and a high-ranking member, later leader following the death of her mentor Zhishan, of Starling City's local triad who seeks to further their drug trade. As a result, she frequently crosses paths with Oliver Queen following their first encounter in Hong Kong during flashbacks depicted in the third season. Throughout the series, she has tried to steal the Alpha-Omega Virus, mounted a failed assassination attempt on Malcolm Merlyn, joined forces with Ben Tuner, Liza Warner, and Carrie Cutter, and worked for A.R.G.U.S.'s Ghost Initiative before being deported back to China, where she reunited with her triad.
 Chien Na Wei appears in a self-titled issue of the Arrow tie-in comic. In flashbacks, she suffered childhood abuse from her father before he and Chien's mother were killed by Zhishan. However, a streak of Chien's hair turned white due to her fear of her father, which led to her being mocked by her peers and bleaching the rest of her hair with hydrogen peroxide to turn it completely white. She is later approached by Zhishan, who promised to make her stronger and more like him.

References

Fictional Chinese people
Comics characters introduced in 2007
DC Comics martial artists
Fictional female assassins
Green Arrow characters
DC Comics female supervillains
Fictional drug dealers
Fictional gangsters
Suicide Squad members
Triad (organized crime)